Perilex is the trade name for an approved indoor three-phase electric power connector system used in Germany, the Netherlands and Sweden. It has mostly been superseded by the IEC 60309 system used throughout Europe.

There are two variants, a more common 16 A version and a rarely used 25 A version. The connectors are equipped with protective earth (PE), a neutral conductor (N) and three phase conductors (L1, L2, L3; formerly: R, S, T). As the German industrial standard VDE 0100 prescribed the phase sequence for all types of three-phase connectors in a way incompatible with the original Perilex pinout, the R and T connectors may have been swapped. The PE socket protrudes slightly in order to give PE "first mate, last break" characteristics. In order to distinguish the variants, the 16 A version has a horizontal PE pin, whereas it is vertical in the 25 A variant.

In Germany, Perilex connectors have been standardised by DIN. The 16 A version is DIN 49445 (socket) and DIN 49446 (plug) and the 25 A version is DIN 49447 (socket) and DIN 49448 (plug). It replaced an earlier flat 4-pin connector (3 phases and neutral) that was standardized in DIN 49450 / DIN 49451. 

Use of the Perilex connectors is usually confined to small businesses (e.g. bakeries, restaurants), medical facilities (hospitals, laboratories) and homes, where it has the advantage of a smaller form factor and better cleanability. However, at construction sites and industrial facilities, the IEC connectors are preferred due to their better robustness and due to being approved for medium-term outdoor use. Furthermore, it is unwise to connect three-phase electrical motors to Perilex sockets due to the aforementioned ambiguity regarding the phase sequence. Since 1 January 1975, the use of the Perilex system has been outlawed in Germany for new industrial installations but continues to be legal in homes, hospitals and small businesses. However, even there, it is being superseded by the IEC 60309 system used throughout Europe.

A conceptually similar (but incompatible) plug exists in Switzerland as SN 441011 type 15 (10 A) and type 25 (16 A).

In France, instead of Perilex, NF C 61-315 was used. NF C 61-315 provides single & multiple phases for rating up to 32 A. Several plug & socket profiles exist to match the phases number and the various rating. But NF C 61-315 is being replaced by IEC 60309 for outdoor use or direct attach for home use (mainly oven plugs).

References 

Mains power connectors